Queen Sirikit 60th Anniversary Stadium  is a multi-purpose stadium in Pathum Thani Province, Thailand. The stadium was built on occasion of celebration the 60th Birthday Anniversary of Queen Sirikit, hence the name of the venue. It is currently used mostly for football matches.  The stadium holds 5,000 people.

References

Multi-purpose stadiums in Thailand
Buildings and structures in Pathum Thani province
Sport in Pathum Thani province